Maya the Bee: The Golden Orb (also called Maya the Bee 3: The Golden Orb) is a 2021 computer-animated comedy adventure film directed by Noel Cleary.

Loosely based on characters from the 1975 anime Maya the Honey Bee and the German children's book The Adventures of Maya the Bee by Waldemar Bonsels, the film is a sequel to the 2018 film Maya the Bee: The Honey Games, and stars the original voice cast of Coco Jack Gillies, Benson Jack Anthony, Frances Berry and Christian Charisiou. The Golden Orb was originally scheduled to be released in Australia on 17 June 2020. However, due to the COVID-19 pandemic, the film was pushed back to 7 January 2021.

Plot
Maya is full of the joys of spring as she tries to wake the hive and Willy to let them know that spring has finally arrived, but the others went back to sleep. Maya and Willy went to the glow worms, but they took Maya and Willy up to wreck the hive and the precious sunstone, much to the displeasure of the Queen. Maya overhears that she and Willy are to be separated because of their calamitous partnership and she needs no further invitation to get away from the hive ‘to do something special’ in order to prove her and Willy’s worth to stay together.

This opportunity comes in the unexpected guise of a passing green ant who is on the run from the muscle-bound beetle boom-bugs, who are after the golden orb he’s carrying. The ant names him Chomp and hands the golden orb to Maya and Willy. They meet up with Arnie and Barney to take the orb back to Bonsai Peak. It turns out this golden orb is the egg of the ant princess whom she calls herself Smoosh, the heir to the ant kingdom. Willy at first thought Smoosh is too squishy. Maya holds Smoosh to greet him. But Smoosh doesn't understand Maya’s name, until it lets out a fart to Willy as a gift. Meanwhile at the hive, Crawley tries to fix the sunstone, but to no avail, much to his dismay. Miss Cassandra calls out that Maya and Willy has left the meadow.

Smoosh begins to cry so Willy tries to sing in panic until they were frightened by the ants again, Willy doesn’t think they can keep going and decided to stop and rest. Meanwhile, the hive is over the place trying to find Maya and Willy. Arnie and Barney make something to cool them down, Maya sings Smoosh a lullaby while placing a diaper on her, It was too dark and Smoosh was afraid. Willy sings a lullaby to her just like Maya did earlier, but feeling tired.

Chomp knows about Maya and Willy and follows Flip and Miss Cassandra to find Maya and Willy while Crawley stays behind. Arnie and Barney complain about their hatred of spiky trees with Maya joining in until they found Loggy Hollow, but they were caught by the beetles again. Maya and Willy found a wanted poster and Willy is ready to give up. They argued until they saw Smoosh disappeared. Maya throws a ball then grabs Smoosh and quickly flies away, she then found Willy, Arnie and Barney, until the beetles came back. They quickly rode on a leaf to get away until Rumba is caught in the river and needs saving quickly. Maya and Willy reconcile their arguments and decide to take Smoosh back to Greenleaf. Until Bumbulus, Henchie, and Boof blocks their path and sends them to a dark cave where they can't escape.

Maya becomes crestfallen when she realizes that they have failed their mission until Miss Cassandra, Flip and Chomp arrive to rescue them. Rumba make amends with Maya and Willy and they warn the ants of Greenleaf about Bumbulus' plan to dispose of Greenleaf and the only way to stop him is to sing a little song. Then a bird arrives and the fight began. Bumbulus was inside when Willy appeared. When the sun finally rises, they join together into a huge spider in the shadow, scaring away the birds. Afterwards, Maya and Willy reunite and Smoosh finally says Maya’s name. Bumbulus apologizes for his selfishness and Bonsai Peak is saved, thus protecting it from further threats. Maya and Willy are returned to the hive and the Queen congratulates them for their journey and decides to not separate them, and thus the spring festival finally now begins.

Cast
Coco Jack Gillies as Maya
Benson Jack Anthony as Willy, Maya's best friend.
Frances Berry as Rumba
Christian Charisiou as Bumbulus, Rumba's brother.
Justine Clarke as the Queen, the ruler of the hive.
Noel Cleary as Henchie
Callan Colley as Boof
Jimmy James Eaton as Crawley
David Collins as Arnie
Shane Dundas as Barney
Evie Gillies as Smoosh
Darren Sabadina as Lief Cutterson
Tom Cossettini as Chomp
Tess Meyer as Miss Cassandra. She was originally voiced by Justine Clarke in the first film.
Sam Haft as Flip. He was originally voiced by Richard Roxburgh in the first two films.
Tin Pang as Weeble
Cam Ralph as Colonel
Jordan Rainford as Interpreter

Production
The box office successes of the first two films, Maya the Bee Movie (2014) and Maya the Bee: The Honey Games (2018), convinced the creative teams in Germany (Studio 100) and Australia (Studio B) to create a third film. The teams wanted to create another story under the guiding principle of "friendship and helping others" that define character of the protagonist Maya, but with a theme different from the first two films. Director Noel Cleary wanted to create a "road movie" where Maya leaves her home, Poppy Meadow, that additionally involved high storytelling stakes.

References

External links
 

2021 fantasy films
2021 computer-animated films
2021 films
Maya the Bee
StudioCanal films
StudioCanal animated films
Flying Bark Productions films
Australian animated feature films
Australian children's animated films
Australian children's comedy films
Australian children's fantasy films
Australian children's adventure films
Australian computer-animated films
Animated comedy films
Films postponed due to the COVID-19 pandemic
2020s Australian animated films
2020s children's animated films
2020s children's comedy films
2020s children's fantasy films
2020s children's adventure films
Animated films about insects
Animated films about friendship
3D animated films
2021 comedy films
Fictional ants
Fictional grasshoppers
Films about bees
Films about royalty
2020s English-language films
2020s American films
2020s British films